The Diocese of Kuopio is a diocese within the Evangelical Lutheran Church of Finland. It was founded in 1939.

Bishops of Kuopio
Eino Sormunen 1939–1962
Olavi Kares 1962–1974
Paavo Kortekangas 1974–1981
Jukka Malmivaara 1981–1984
Matti Sihvonen 1984–1996
Wille Riekkinen 1996–2012
Jari Jolkkonen 2012–

See also
Evangelical Lutheran Church of Finland

External links

Lutheran districts established in the 20th century
Kuopio